AspectC++ is an aspect-oriented extension of C and C++ languages. It has a source-to-source compiler, which translates AspectC++ source code into compilable C++. The compiler is available under the GNU GPL, though some extensions specific to Microsoft Windows are only available through pure-systems GmbH.

Aspect-oriented programming allows modularizing cross-cutting concerns in a single module, an aspect.
Aspects can modify existing classes, but most commonly they provide 'advice' that runs before, after, or around
existing functionality.

Example 
All calls to a specific function can be traced using an aspect, rather than inserting 'cerr' or print statements in many places:
aspect Tracer
{ 
   advice call("% %Iter::Reset(...)") : before()
   {
      cerr << "about to call Iter::Reset for " << JoinPoint::signature() << endl;
   }
};

The Tracer aspect will print out a message before any call to %Iter::Reset.  The %Iter syntax
means that it will match all classes that end in Iter.

Each 'matched' location in the source code is called a join point—the advice is joined to (or advises) that code.
AspectC++ provides a join point API to provide and access to information about the join point.  For example, the function:
JoinPoint::signature()
returns the name of the function (that matched %Iter::Reset) that is about to be called.

The join point API also provides compile-time type information that can be used within an
aspect to access the type or the value of the arguments and the return type and return value of a
method or function.

References

External links
 AspectC++
 Articles on aspect-oriented programming and AspectC++ at past AOSD conferences

Aspect-oriented programming
C++ programming language family